7th Carnatic Battalion could refer to:

66th Punjabis in 1769
67th Punjabis in 1770